Zvonimir Šarlija (born 29 August 1996) is a Croatian professional footballer who plays as a defender for Greek Super League club Panathinaikos.

Career
On 29 June 2019, Slaven Belupo announced that Šarlija had moved to CSKA Moscow, with CSKA confirming the season-long loan deal, with the first option to buy, on 1 July. On 18 January 2020, CSKA Moscow confirmed that their loan deal with Šarlija had ended, and that he'd joined Kasımpaşa on loan for the remainder of the 2019/20 season with Kasımpaşa confining they had an option to make the move permanent at the end of the season.

On 31 August 2020, it was announced that Šarlija signed for Turkish club Ankaragücü. The reported fee was €350.000 .

On 30 July 2021, he signed a two-year contract with Panathinaikos.

Career statistics

Honours  
Panathinaikos
Greek Cup: 2021–22

References

External links
 

1996 births
Living people
Sportspeople from Koprivnica
Association football defenders
Croatian footballers
NK Slaven Belupo players
NK Solin players
PFC CSKA Moscow players
Kasımpaşa S.K. footballers
MKE Ankaragücü footballers
Panathinaikos F.C. players
Croatian Football League players
First Football League (Croatia) players
Russian Premier League players
Süper Lig players
Super League Greece players
Croatian expatriate footballers
Expatriate footballers in Russia
Expatriate footballers in Turkey
Expatriate footballers in Greece
Croatian expatriate sportspeople in Russia
Croatian expatriate sportspeople in Turkey
Croatian expatriate sportspeople in Greece